The Siena Saints baseball team, formerly the Siena Indians, is a varsity intercollegiate athletic team of Siena College in Loudonville, New York. The team is a member of the Metro Atlantic Athletic Conference, which is part of the National Collegiate Athletic Association's Division I. The team plays its home games at Siena Baseball Field in Loudonville, New York. The Saints have been coached by Tony Rossi since the 1969–1970 season. Rossi announced his retirement effective March 20, 2023.

Notable former players
Tim Christman
Matt Gage
Billy Harrell
Gary Holle
John Lannan

See also
List of NCAA Division I baseball programs

References

External links